Peking Express is a Dutch/Flemish reality game show.

Peking Express may also refer to:

Peking Express (film), 1951 film starring  Joseph Cotten, Corinne Calvet and Edmund Gwenn 
Shanghai Express (film), 1932 film remade in 1951 as Peking Express